Rhayader is a market town and community in Powys, Wales, within the historic county of Radnorshire.

The population was 2,088, with 55% of the community having some form of Welsh identity, according to the 2011 census. It includes the Elan Valley.

Rhayader holds the record for the lowest-ever temperature recorded in Wales, -23.3 °C on 21 January 1940.

Etymology 
The name, Rhayader, is a partly-Anglicised form of its Welsh name,  ('the waterfall'),  or, to distinguish it from other places named after waterfalls,  ('waterfall [on the] Wye'). Strictly speaking, according to place-name spelling conventions in Welsh, the name of the town would be , and the waterfall itself , but it seems that this distinction is usually ignored.

History 

Rhayader has long been a natural stopping point for travellers – the Romans had a stop-over camp in the Elan Valley, monks travelled between the abbeys of Strata Florida and Abbeycwmhir and drovers headed to the lucrative markets with their livestock. It was not until the 12th century that a documented history of the town began with the building of Rhayader Castle in 1177. Little remains today, with the exception of a dry moat that can be seen from Wauncapel Park.

One of the oldest buildings in Rhayader is the Old Swan, which stands on the corner of West and South Streets Rhayader. The original building was mentioned in 1676 as being one of the two inns in Rhayader at that date. Some changes were made in 1683, including the rebuilding of the three chimney stacks, and this date is carved into the old timbers inside the building.

In the 19th century, turnpike roads were only passable on payment of extortionate tolls, imposing additional burdens on already poor communities. This led to the Rebecca Riots across South and Mid Wales from 1839 to 1842, with no fewer than six of Rhayader's tollgates being demolished with impunity by local farmers dressed as women. The actions of these "Rebeccaites" led to a Commission of Inquiry being set up, and most of Rebecca's grievances were righted two years later.

This was to change the face of Rhayader forever, bringing thousands of workers involved in building this massive complex of dams and reservoirs to the area. A new railway was built connecting this huge area with the main network in Rhayader, and the construction of a new village to house the workers was built on the banks of the River Elan. Work started in 1894 and the scheme was officially opened in 1904 by King Edward VII and Queen Alexandra.

The area around the town has several of cairns and standing stones dating from several thousand years BCE. An important hoard of gold jewellery dating from the 1st–2nd centuries AD was found nearby in 1899. Known as the Rhayader Hoard, it is now in the Romano-British collection of the British Museum.

Governance
Rhayader is an electoral ward to Powys County Council, electing one county councillor.  the incumbent is Cllr Angela Davies of the Liberal Democrats.

Rhayader Town Council represents the town at the local level, with 41 town councillors elected from the Rhayader and  community wards.

Notable people 
 Jonathan Williams (ca.1752 – 1829), clergyman, schoolmaster and antiquarian writer.
 Thomas Jones (1819–1882), Independent minister, known as the Welsh Poet-Preacher
 John Evans (1867–1958), emigrated to Canada in 1890 and became a farmer and politician
 Mary Jones (1896–1990), film actress.

Transport 

The station on the Mid-Wales Railway line that served the town was closed on 31 December 1962.

A bus service connects with outlying villages and neighbouring towns, with two-hourly daytime departures to Builth Wells, Llandrindod Wells, Aberystwyth and Newtown, with connections to Hereford, Shrewsbury and Cardiff.

Due to the volume of traffic generated by the convergence of two trunk roads — the A44 and the A470 — the construction of a bypass to relieve congestion at the town centre crossroads has been an ongoing debate for many years.

Amenities 
Tourism and agriculture are the most important industries locally. Walkers and cyclists are drawn to Rhayader for the abundance of trails and bridleways surrounding the town, which is the gateway to a massive complex of reservoirs and dams (The Elan Valley). This vast area is home to some of Britain's rarest wildlife and plants, including red kites, along with magnificent feats of engineering.

There are a number of hotels, bed and breakfasts and campsites to accommodate the large number of visitors that travel to the area all year round.

Rhayader is also home to a community founded art and heritage complex which includes a museum and gallery, a leisure centre, numerous parks and all the amenities expected of a larger town. Potter Phil Rogers has his studio in Rhayader. There are an abundance of shops, cash facilities, restaurants, takeaways and supermarkets catering to both the local population and visitors to the area.

Rhayader is also renowned for being the town with the highest concentration of pubs and drinking establishments, per capita, in the UK, with one to each 173 people.

In nearby Nant-glas, across the river Wye from the village of Llanwrthwl, the Living Willow Theatre, an open-air theatre constructed of living willow trees, was opened in 2007.

Sport 
Rhayader Town F.C., despite previously having some success in the League of Wales - the top-tier of domestic Welsh football between 1997 and 2002, ceased to exist in the summer of 2006. The club has since reformed, and in its inaugural season gained promotion into the Spar Mid Wales League. A subsequent promotion to the Cymru Alliance followed, but a finishing position of 15th saw the team relegated after just one season. The town's rugby union team play in the Cambrian Training Mid Wales League. There is also a cricket club and thriving local darts, dominos and pool leagues.

The town is also well known by motocross fans. Every summer a series of events take place at the nearby Cwmythig Hill circuit, with many of Britain's top riders taking part. The race series regularly attracts over 5,000 spectators.

As part of the annual carnival celebrations, Rhayader also plays host to a number of World Championship events in lesser celebrated sports, including wheelbarrow racing and rock-paper-scissors.

Development 

Rhayader and its surrounding districts are supported by development organisation Rhayader 2000 Ltd, established in 1996 to revive Rhayader's economy. Rhayader 2000 Ltd is a voluntary sector organisation representing a cross section of the local community. It builds links with Powys County Council, Rhayader Town Council, local businesses and charitable and voluntary organisations.

References

External links 

 Rhayader Website
 www.geograph.co.uk : photos of Rhayader and surrounding area
 Rhayader carnival website
 Transition Town Rhayader Website

 
Towns in Powys
Communities in Powys
Wards of Powys
Market towns in Wales